Aegon UK (Aegon) is an Edinburgh based financial services provider specialising in pensions, investments and insurance.

Aegon is the brand name for Scottish Equitable plc and it is a subsidiary of Aegon N.V., a multi-national life insurance, pension and asset management company headquartered in The Hague, Netherlands. Its mission is to help people achieve a lifetime of financial security.

History

The Scottish Equitable Life Assurance Society was founded in Edinburgh in 1831 and in 1861 it began paying out its first pension to a customer.
 
In 1994, the company became Scottish Equitable plc with Aegon N.V. buying a 40% stake in the business. Aegon NV increased that stake to 100% by 1998.

In 2006 Scottish Equitable plc was rebranded as Aegon Scottish Equitable and in 2009 this was shortened to Aegon, although the legal entity is still Scottish Equitable plc.

Aegon acquired Cofunds, a UK based investment and administration service in 2016.

In May 2016 Aegon announced that it would acquire BlackRock's UK defined contribution platform (including Master Trust) and administration business, with the transfer completing in 2018. The Master Trust was authorised by The Pensions Regulator in September 2019.

Products and customers

Aegon is a financial services provider with products designed for individuals and business customers. Its products are available through financial advisers or in the case of workplace pensions, made available via an employer. It offers a range of pensions, individual savings accounts (ISAs), life insurance and investment products for individual customers. It offers workplace pensions, including a Master Trust option.

In the UK, Aegon has over 3 million customers and manages around £170bn of customers’ savings.

People and locations

Aegon has around 3,000 UK employees working from offices in Edinburgh, London, Lytham St Annes, Peterborough and Witham.

It offers employees career opportunities including graduate apprenticeships while working and a marketing graduate scheme.

Company management

Executive committee

Chief Executive Officer, Mike Holliday-Williams, appointed 2019

Chief Financial Officer, Stephen McGee, appointed 2016

Chief Risk Officer, Jim Ewing, appointed 2014

Management team

Managing Director - Digital Solutions, Mark Till, appointed 2016

Managing Director - Existing Business, Dougy Grant, appointed 2016

Managing Director - Transformation, Innovation and Growth, Ed Dymott, appointed 2018

Chief Distribution Officer, Ronnie Taylor, appointed 2018

Chief Internal Auditor, Alison Morris, appointed 2019

Chief Technology Officer, Nick Rodway, appointed 2019

Human Resources Director, Gill Scott, appointed 2010

General Counsel and Company Secretary, James Mackenzie, appointed 2012

Sponsorship

From 2009 to 2017, Aegon was the Lead partner of British Tennis, supporting all levels of players from grass roots to professional events. It also sponsored the National Fed Cup and Davis Cup teams, with the Aegon GB Davis Cup Team becoming world champions in 2015 – the first time a GB team had won in 79 years.

In 2019 Aegon was a sponsor for Pride Edinburgh and Essex Pride events.

Charity

In 2007, Aegon started a Breakfast Club to provide children with a free, healthy and nutritional start to the day. Working with Edinburgh local councils, they identified schools with the greatest need, and currently fund over 1,000 breakfasts a week, to participating schools.

Aegon has its own charity committee, which supports nominated local charities and a national charity, as voted for by its staff, each year.

In 2019 it raised £106,000 for its nominated local charities.

In 2020 it donated £250,000 to support charities during the coronavirus pandemic.

References

External links

 

Companies based in Edinburgh
Insurance companies of Scotland
British subsidiaries of foreign companies
1998 mergers and acquisitions
Financial services companies established in 1831
British companies established in 1831
Scottish brands
1831 establishments in Scotland